In geometry, the decagrammic antiprism is one in an infinite set of nonconvex antiprisms formed by triangle sides and two regular star polygon caps, in this case two decagrams.

See also

 Prismatic uniform polyhedron

External links

Paper models of prisms and antiprisms

Prismatoid polyhedra